Xanthoconium affine is a species of edible bolete fungus of the genus Xanthoconium. First described as a species of Boletus by Charles Horton Peck in 1873, it was placed in its current genus by Rolf Singer in 1944.

See also
List of North American boletes

References

External links

Boletaceae
Edible fungi
Fungi described in 1873
Taxa named by Charles Horton Peck